Occult Medicine is the third full-length studio album by the French death metal band Yyrkoon. It was released in 2006 on Osmose Productions records.

Track listing
All Songs Written & Arranged By Yyrkoon. (Les Editions Hurlantes)
 "Intro" – 0:16
 "Doctor X" – 3:56
 "Censored Project" – 4:35
 "Blasphemy" – 4:10
 "Occult Medicine" – 6:51
 "Revenant Horde" – 4:49
 "Reversed World" – 4:30
 "Trapped into Life" – 4:17
 "Surgical Distortion" – 4:37
 "Schyzophrenic Carnage" – 3:39
 "Erase the Past" – 4:35

Personnel
Stephane Souteyrand: Vocals, Rhythm & Lead Guitar
Geoffrey Gautier: Lead & Rhythm Guitar
Victorien Vilchiz: Bass
Dirk Verbeuren: Drums, Percussion

Production
Produced, Recorded, Engineered & Mixed By Jacob Hansen at Hansen Studios, November 2003

References

External links
"Occult Medicine" at discogs

Yyrkoon (band) albums
2004 albums
Osmose Productions albums
Albums produced by Jacob Hansen